Bella Vista (Spanish for "Beautiful View") is a census-designated place (CDP) in Shasta County, California. Its population is 3,641 as of the 2020 census, up from 2,781 from the 2010 census. Historically, Bella Vista was a semi-large lumber town which hosted its own railroad.

Geography
According to the United States Census Bureau, the CDP covers an area of 22.3 square miles (57.9 km2), 99.36% of it land and 0.64% of it water.

History

Bella Vista was once a thriving Lumber town. A lumber flume fed a mill at the present day location of the end of Meyers Road and Deschutes. The flume was completed by the Shasta Lumber Company in August 1888 when it reached Bella Vista. The lumber flume was a V-shape structure which was elevated to 90’ in height and supported by scaffolds. Lumber from nearby Round Mountain was shipping via the flume to the mill at Bella Vista where it would be treated and sent south to the railhead at Anderson CA. Present day Bella Vista was the end of the lumber flume and the site was originally called, the dump, because it was the dumping point of the lumber coming off the lumber flume. The original town site was established with a general merchandise store owned by the Shasta Lumber Company, company offices, a planning mill and additional buildings. Bella Vista was once a thriving community and at its peak, hosted a population of 2,000. Bella Vista's community consisted of saloons, barber shops and various stores, including gas stations.

Bella Vista once hosted the Anderson and Bella Vista Railway which was a 15-mile freight carrier that hauled lumber and other commodities to the Southern Pacific railhead in Anderson CA. The bottleneck of the operation was the transfer of the lumber from the mill at Bella Vista to the nearest rail connection, which was 10 miles away in Anderson CA and on the wrong side of the Sacramento River. In about 1891, work began on the Anderson & Bella Vista Railroad down the valley of Cow Creek to the Southern Pacific railhead in Anderson. The railroad was abandoned in the 1930s and torn up shortly after.

The distance of this lumber flume was 32-miles long from its start at Hatchet Mountain to its dumping point. From the dump, the Shasta Lumber Company wanted to continue construction of the lumber flume towards Anderson, but the valley terrain was too level to allow the lumber flume to operate and they had to think of additional methods to transport their lumber from the dump to the Southern Pacific's station in Anderson for their product to be shipped to the market.

Demographics

The 2010 United States Census reported that Bella Vista had a population of 2,781. The racial makeup of Bella Vista was 2,559 (92.0%) White, 16 (0.6%) African American, 41 (1.5%) Native American, 30 (1.1%) Asian, 6 (0.2%) Pacific Islander, 43 (1.5%) from other races, and 86 (3.1%) from two or more races. Hispanic or Latino of any race were 179 persons (6.4%).

The Census reported that 2,773 people (99.7% of the population) lived in households, 3 (0.1%) lived in non-institutionalized group quarters, and 5 (0.2%) were institutionalized.

There were 1,037 households, out of which 321 (31.0%) had children under the age of 18 living in them, 646 (62.3%) were opposite-sex married couples living together, 101 (9.7%) had a female householder with no husband present, 57 (5.5%) had a male householder with no wife present.  There were 52 (5.0%) unmarried opposite-sex partnerships, and 9 (0.9%) same-sex married couples or partnerships. 175 households (16.9%) were made up of individuals, and 79 (7.6%) had someone living alone who was 65 years of age or older. The average household size was 2.67.  There were 804 families (77.5% of all households); the average family size was 2.96.

The population was spread out, with 594 people (21.4%) under the age of 18, 197 people (7.1%) aged 18 to 24, 542 people (19.5%) aged 25 to 44, 949 people (34.1%) aged 45 to 64, and 499 people (17.9%) who were 65 years of age or older.  The median age was 46.2 years. For every 100 females, there were 97.4 males.  For every 100 females age 18 and over, there were 98.8 males.

The homeowner vacancy rate was 2.2%; the rental vacancy rate was 6.2%.  2,276 people (81.8% of the population) lived in owner-occupied housing units and 497 people (17.9%) lived in rental housing units.

Politics

Education
Bella Vista Elementary School District

References

Census-designated places in Shasta County, California
Census-designated places in California